Adam and Evelyne, released in the U.S. as Adam and Evalyn, is a 1949 romance film starring Stewart Granger and Jean Simmons. According to Robert Osborne, host of Turner Classic Movies, this suited the stars, as they were romantically involved at the time, despite their age difference. They married the next year.

Plot
When jockey Chris Kirby (Fred Johnson) is fatally injured in a horse race, he gets his best friend, gambler Adam Black (Stewart Granger), to promise to take care of his teenage daughter, Evelyne (Jean Simmons), who has been raised apart from her father. Unbeknownst to Adam, Evelyne had been led to believe that Adam is her father in correspondence between parent and child. Adam is unable to tell her the truth; his butler and friend Bill Murray (Edwin Styles) tries and fails as well. Finally, Adam's sometime girlfriend Moira (Helen Cherry) breaks the news to the girl.

Adam sends Evelyne to an exclusive boarding school. When she has grown up, she reappears unexpectedly in his life. Because of the hatred she has for gambling, Adam does not reveal that he stages illegal gambling sessions; instead he tells her that he makes his money on the stock exchange. She begins casually dating Adam's no-good brother Roddy (Raymond Young).

When Adam tells Moira that he is getting out of the business, she accuses him of being in love with his "ward". Roddy has his own grudge against his brother – Adam refuses to finance a shady deal – and the two of them tip off the police about Adam's last operation. Roddy also brings Evelyne to see what Adam really does for a living.

Shocked, she quarrels with Adam and leaves. A kindly gambler, Colonel Bradley (Wilfred Hyde-White), gives her some sage advice and persuades her to reconcile with Adam.

Cast
 Stewart Granger as Adam Black
 Jean Simmons as Evelyne Kirby
 Edwin Styles as Bill Murray
 Raymond Young as Roddy Black
 Helen Cherry as Moira
 Beatrice Varley as Mrs. Parker, a gambler
 Joan Swinstead as Molly
 Wilfred Hyde-White as Colonel Bradley
 Fred Johnson as Chris Kirby
 Geoffrey Denton as Police Inspector Collins
 Peter Reynolds as David
 Mona Washbourne as Mrs Salop

Production
Stewart Granger says the storyline of the film was his, based on the old silent film Daddy Long Legs, He contacted the writer Noel Langley and they wrote it as a vehicle for Jean Simmons. "It was a very good vehicle for her", he said. "It was a sweet film, a charming light comedy."

Director Harold French also said he "really liked" the film.
At that stage I could pick and choose and I really liked that one. I became producer because Paul Soskin, who was to have produced it, didn’t like the fact that I had employed an actor called Edwin Styles for the part of the valet; I thought he was quite good and he got on well with Jimmy [Stewart] Granger in his first comedy role. Paul said he wanted to go back to America, and would I take over as producer? I didn’t mind... I did enjoy that film and I adored working with Jean Simmons, a lovely actress.
This was the first adult role of Jean Simmons, who had become a star in Great Expectations.

Simmons and Granger were rumoured to be romantically involved during filming although they denied it to the press.

Production of the film was interrupted by a strike from crew members at Denham Studios in protest over recent sackings of film workers. (Others which ceased production were The Cardboard Cavalier and Tottie True.)

Reception
The film was voted best comedy of the year at the International Film Festival in Locarno Switzerland.

Box office
It was successful at the box office in Britain.

Critical
Critic Leonard Maltin called it a "Pleasant but ordinary tale"; and Rank and File wrote, "The audience isn't certain whether they are watching a drama or a not particularly funny screwball comedy...Despite these shortcoming the film has a certain charm and remains watchable."

References

External links 
 
Review of film at Variety

1949 films
British black-and-white films
Films directed by Harold French
Films about gambling
1949 romantic drama films
Two Cities Films films
British romantic drama films
Films with screenplays by Noel Langley
1940s British films